1995 is the debut album by experimental jazz/jazz fusion group Screaming Headless Torsos. It was recorded in 1995 and released on June 13 the same year. On March 26, 2002, the album was re-released with two new tracks, Jimi Hendrix's "Little Wing" and the Beatles "Something".

Track listing

Release and reception
The reviews for the album were generally positive. Glenn Astarita from Allmusic recommended the album, writing that it was "an early glimpse of one of the most powerful jazz-rock units to emerge in quite some time." Tony Green from the JazzTimes magazine wrote that "the band's vocal-fronted, hard-charging amalgam of funk, rock and jazz should be more than a belly full for folks who haven't heard them before".

Personnel
 Dean Bowman – vocals
 David Fiuczynski – guitar
 Fima Ephron – bass
 Jojo Mayer – drums
 Daniel Sadownick – percussion

External links
 [ 1995 at Allmusic]
 1995 at JazzTimes
 1995 at Amazon.com

References

1995 debut albums
Warner Music Group albums
Screaming Headless Torsos albums
Discovery Records albums